Carts on Foster is a collection of food carts, or "pod", in Portland, Oregon's Foster-Powell neighborhood, in the United States. Carts on Foster is owned and managed by Steve Woolard.

History

In 2014, Carts on Foster was the starting point for Santacon PDX, a pub crawl in which attendees dress as Santa Claus.
In 2016, approximately ten carts in the pod were vandalized. Carts on Foster was included in Willamette Week 2018 list of "Our Favorite Beer Carts". The following businesses have operated in the pod:

 Bari
 Egg Carton
 El Local
 LoRell's Chicken Shack
 Mauna Kea
 PieCake
 Pod Bar
 Road Runner Mesquite BBQ
 Rose City Waffles
 Salon Bucci

References

External links

 

Foster-Powell, Portland, Oregon
Food carts in Portland, Oregon